Mississippi Highway 342 (MS 342), also known as Black Zion Road, is a  west–east state highway in eastern Pontotoc County, Mississippi, connecting MS 41 near Pontotoc to West Main Street east of Pontotoc. It is generally a narrow two-lane route.

Route description
MS 342 begins at an intersection with MS 41 just southeast of the Pontotoc city limits. The highway heads north for about  before coming to an intersection with U.S. Route 278 (US 278)/MS 6 just outside of Trace State Park. The road continues for another  to end at West Main Street and Faulkner Road.

The entire length of Mississippi Highway 342 is a rural, two-lane, state highway.

Major intersections

References

External links

342
Transportation in Pontotoc County, Mississippi